Boyd Blaine "Fox" Chambers (November 10, 1884 – April 26, 1964) was an American football, basketball, and baseball coach, and college athletics administrator. He served as the head football coach at Marshall University from 1909 to 1916, at Bethany College in West Virginia in 1917, and at the University of Cincinnati from 1918 to 1921, compiling a career college football record of 50–44–7. Chambers was also the head basketball coach at Marshall during the 1908–09 season and at Cincinnati from 1918 to 1928, tallying a career college basketball mark of 122–97. In addition, he was the head baseball coach at Marshall (1910–1917), Cincinnati (1919–1928), and Miami University (1932), amassing a career college baseball record of 163–104–4.

Tower Play controversy
In 1915 Chambers was involved in a controversy with what would become known as a "Tower Play" during a game between West Virginia Mountaineers and the Marshall Thundering Herd. The Mountaineers were heavily favored and their head coach, Sol Metzger, told the media he would "eat his hat if Marshall scores." Chambers developed a special play to prevent the shutout. On the Thundering Herd fourth possession Marshall moved the ball down to the 15-yard line. Marshall back Dayton Carter came into the game. Marshall quarterback Brad Workman, took the snap and set up to pass. Marshall's tackle, Okey Taylor, and Carter ran toward the end zone. Carter was hoisted onto Taylor shoulders as Workman rifled a high pass in their direction. Carter caught the ball and fell into the end zone for a score. Metzger argued with the officials, but the referee and umpire could find no rule to discount the score. The Mountaineers won the game by a final score of 92–6.

Head coaching record

Football

Basketball

References

External links
 

1884 births
1964 deaths
Basketball coaches from Ohio
Bethany Bison athletic directors
Bethany Bison football coaches
Cincinnati Bearcats athletic directors
Cincinnati Bearcats baseball coaches
Cincinnati Bearcats football coaches
Cincinnati Bearcats men's basketball coaches
Denison University alumni
Marshall Thundering Herd athletic directors
Marshall Thundering Herd baseball coaches
Marshall Thundering Herd football coaches
Marshall Thundering Herd men's basketball coaches
Miami RedHawks baseball coaches
People from Columbiana County, Ohio